Engraulisoma taeniatum is a species of characiform fish that is found in Argentina, Brazil, Ecuador and Peru.  it is found in the basins of the Paraguay and Napo Rivers.  Is the sole member of its genus.

References
 

Characiformes

Freshwater fish of Argentina
Freshwater fish of Brazil
Freshwater fish of Ecuador
Freshwater fish of Peru
Fish described in 1981